Strigosella may refer to:
 Strigosella (gastropod), a genus of mollusks in the family Trochidae
 Strigosella (plant), a genus of flowering plants in the family Brassicaceae